Derby Type 4 may refer to:
 British Rail Class 44
 British Rail Class 45
 British Rail Class 46